Lebron v. National Railroad Passenger Corporation, 513 U.S. 374 (1995), is a United States Supreme Court case in which the Court held that Amtrak is a government agency and thus is subject to the First Amendment.

Background 
Michael A. Lebron rented a large billboard in Amtrak's Penn Station. The advertisement was highly critical of the Coors Brewing Company for their support of the Contras in Nicaragua. The railroad turned down the ad because it was political, although the particular point of view was not an issue.

The District Court ruled that Amtrak, because of its close ties to the Federal Government, was a Government actor for First Amendment purposes, and that its rejection of the display was unconstitutional. The Court of Appeals reversed, noting that Amtrak was, by the terms of the legislation that created it, not a Government entity, and concluding that the Government was not so involved with Amtrak that the latter's decisions could be considered federal action.

Decision 
Even though Amtrak is not incorporated as a government agency, it largely functions as one. Similar to the ruling in Burton v. Wilmington Parking Authority, the court found that the public and private entities functioned together to the point where Amtrak was covered by the First Amendment.

Later, in Department of Transportation v. Association of American Railroads, the court held that Amtrak is a governmental entity for purposes of determining the validity of the metrics and standards.

References

External links
 

1995 in United States case law
United States Supreme Court cases
United States Supreme Court cases of the Rehnquist Court
Amtrak
United States First Amendment case law
Railway litigation in 1995
Pennsylvania Plaza
Billboards
United States Free Speech Clause case law